Cobandrahlepis is an extinct genus of phyllolepid placoderm found in New South Wales, Australia.

References

Placoderms of Australia
Phyllolepids
Fossil taxa described in 2005